James P. McKenzie (born November 3, 1969) is a Canadian ice hockey coach and former player. He is the current head coach of the USHL Muskegon Lumberjacks after being hired midway through the 2011/12 season.

Selected 73rd overall in the 1989 NHL Entry Draft by the Hartford Whalers, McKenzie primarily played as an enforcer throughout his career, which combined with his height at 6 feet 4 inches, earned him the nickname "Big Jim". He also played for the Dallas Stars, Pittsburgh Penguins, Winnipeg Jets/Phoenix Coyotes, Mighty Ducks of Anaheim, Washington Capitals, New Jersey Devils, and Nashville Predators. In his 15 seasons in the National Hockey League, McKenzie played 880 regular season games, scoring 48 goals and 52 assists for 100 points, and collecting 1,739 penalty minutes. He also played in 51 playoff games, scoring no points and collecting 38 penalty minutes, holding the record for most games without a point among forwards in an NHL playoff career. He won the Stanley Cup with New Jersey in 2003.

Career statistics

Regular season and playoffs

External links

1969 births
Canadian ice hockey left wingers
Dallas Stars players
Florida Panthers scouts
Hartford Whalers draft picks
Hartford Whalers players
Ice hockey people from Saskatchewan
Living people
Mighty Ducks of Anaheim players
Moose Jaw Warriors players
Nashville Predators announcers
Nashville Predators players
New Jersey Devils players
Phoenix Coyotes players
Pittsburgh Penguins players
Springfield Indians players
Stanley Cup champions
Vegas Golden Knights scouts
Victoria Cougars (WHL) players
Washington Capitals players
Winnipeg Jets (1979–1996) players